Nepal Dalit Utthan Manch is a Nepalese Dalit movement, linked to the Nepal Sadbhavana Party (Anandidevi). Sebal Ram is the president of the organisation.

References

Dalit wings of political parties in Nepal